Sandra L. Frankel is the former Supervisor of the Town of Brighton, Monroe County, New York. A former 
Brighton school board member (6 years) and BOCES I Monroe Board of Education (10 years), Vice President of both, Frankel served for 20 years as town supervisor, the elected executive of an urban suburb of 35,000 population.

In 1998, Frankel won the Democratic nomination for Lieutenant Governor of New York in the 1998 statewide Primary Election. She lost the general election on a ticket with then New York City Council Speaker Peter Vallone. Republican Mary Donohue won the lieutenant governorship on a ticket with George Pataki.

In 2002, Frankel sought the lieutenant governorship again, but dropped out to foster party unity and endorsed Dennis Mehiel, who lost the general election on a ticket with State Comptroller Carl McCall.

Frankel was one of many names mentioned as a potential candidate for the New York's 29th congressional district election, 2010. She declined to run, leaving the race to Matthew Zeller.

In 2011, Frankel was the Democratic nominee for Monroe County Executive. She lost the race to incumbent Maggie Brooks, 57%-43%. She was again Democratic nominee for Monroe County Executive in 2015. She lost to County Clerk Cheryl DiNolfo 59%-41%.

1998 NYS Democratic ticket
Governor: Peter Vallone
Lieutenant Governor: Sandra Frankel
Comptroller: Carl McCall
Attorney General: Eliot Spitzer
U.S. Senate: Charles Schumer

Electoral history
1998 Results for NYS Governor and Lieutenant Governor
George Pataki and Mary Donohue (R-C) (inc.), 54%
Peter Vallone and Sandra Frankel (D-WF), 33%
Tom Golisano and Laureen Oliver (I), 8%
Betsy McCaughey Ross and Jonathan C. Reiter (L), 1.4%

External links
Campaign website
Brighton Town Supervisor official website

Living people
New York (state) Democrats
People from Brighton, Monroe County, New York
Speech and language pathologists
Stanford University alumni
Town supervisors in New York (state)
Tulane University alumni
Women in New York (state) politics
1941 births
21st-century American women